Juma Darwish Al-Mashari commonly known as Juma Darwish (born 29 September 1984) is an Omani footballer who plays for Al-Nasr S.C.S.C. in Oman Professional League.

Club career
On 25 July 2013, he signed a one-year contract with his first most club Al-Oruba SC. On 15 July 2014, he signed a contract with Al-Nasr S.C.S.C.

Club career statistics

International career
Juma is part of the first team squad of the Oman national football team. He was selected for the national team for the first time in 2010.  He has made appearances in the 2010 Gulf Cup of Nations, the 2014 FIFA World Cup qualification, the 2013 Gulf Cup of Nations and the 2015 AFC Asian Cup qualification and has represented the national team in the 2011 AFC Asian Cup qualification.

National team career statistics

Goals for Senior National Team
Scores and results list Oman's goal tally first.

Honours

Club
With Al-Oruba
Omani Super Cup (1): 2011

References

External links

Juma Darwish Al-Mashari - GOAL.com
Juma Darwish Al-Mashari - FootballDatabase.eu
Juma Darwish Al-Mashari - GOALZZ.com
Juma Darwish Al-Mashari - KOOORA.com

1984 births
Living people
People from Muscat, Oman
Omani footballers
Oman international footballers
Association football midfielders
Ahli Sidab Club players
Al-Orouba SC players
Muscat Club players
Dhofar Club players
Al-Nasr SC (Salalah) players
Oman Professional League players